Ajilo Elogu Maria Goretti born 26 June 1963, is a Ugandan female politician and legislator. She represents the people of Kaberamaido as the district woman representative in the Parliament of Uganda.

See also 
 Parliament of Uganda
 Kaberamaido District
 List of members of the tenth Parliament of Uganda
 Luweero District

External links 
 Website of the Parliament of Uganda

References 

Living people
1963 births
Members of the Parliament of Uganda
Women members of the Parliament of Uganda